Theus is a surname. Notable people with the name include:
Darius Theus (born 1990), American professional basketball player
Jeremiah Theus (sometimes Jeremiah Theüs) (1716–74), Swiss-born American painter
John Theus (born 1994), American football offensive tackle
Lucius Theus (1922–2007), Major General in the United States Air Force
Reggie Theus (born 1957), American basketball player and head coach

See also

Theuns